The Royal Observatory of Madrid is a historic observatory situated on a small hill next to the Buen Retiro Park in Madrid, Spain.  It was completed in 1790 and took over some of the work previously done by the naval observatory on the south coast.

It is the seat of the Spanish National Astronomical Observatory and the Observatorio Geofísico Central, both
administered by the  National Geographic Institute (via its department of Astronomía, Geofísica y Aplicaciones Espaciales).

Architecture
The observatory was designed by Juan de Villanueva, architect to Charles III of Spain, It represents one of the highlights of Spanish neoclassical architecture. Its domed lantern was conceived as a classical circular temple.

Equipment
Shortly after construction, the observatory was equipped with a 25-foot reflecting telescope by William Herschel. The instrument was dismantled in the Peninsular War and only partially survived.  It has been reconstructed in recent years.

Current use
Madrid is affected by light pollution and is not a good location for optical astronomy. Conditions are much better in other parts of Spanish territory, notably the Canary Islands, the second-best location for optical and infrared astronomy in the Northern Hemisphere, after Mauna Kea Observatory, Hawaii.

The observatory can be viewed by prior arrangement. The historic scientific equipment on display includes the reconstructed Hershel Telescope.
The visit also takes in the library which is housed in the Villanueva building.

See also
 Spanish National Observatory
 List of museums in Madrid

References

External links

 Official website

Astronomical observatories in Spain
Buen Retiro Park
Bien de Interés Cultural landmarks in Madrid
Infrastructure completed in 1790
Juan de Villanueva buildings
Libraries in Madrid
Neoclassical architecture in Madrid
Buildings and structures in Jerónimos neighborhood, Madrid